Tarzan and the Lost City is a 1998 American adventure film directed by Carl Schenkel, and starring Casper Van Dien and Jane March with Steven Waddington. The screenplay by Bayard Johnson and J. Anderson Black is loosely based on the Tarzan stories by Edgar Rice Burroughs. The film received largely negative reviews and was a box office bomb.

One of the film's producers, Stanley S. Canter, had previously produced another Tarzan film for Warner Bros., Greystoke: The Legend of Tarzan, Lord of the Apes (1984).

Plot Synopsis 
In 1913, on the night before Jane Porter's wedding to John Clayton II (also known as Tarzan, who is something of a celebrity) her bridegroom receives a disturbing vision of his childhood homeland in peril; The educated explorer and treasure seeker Nigel Ravens is seeking the legendary city of Opar, to plunder its ancient treasures and uncover dangerous powers. Much to Jane's distress and confusion, Clayton leaves for Africa to help, meeting up with the shaman Mugambe, whose village was plundered by Ravens to find a key to Opar.

Just as Tarzan's efforts to negotiate with Ravens to turn back fail, Jane decides to follow her fiancé. While glad to see her, he must now protect her while trying to stop Ravens and his men from continuing their expedition.

Cast 
 Casper Van Dien as John Clayton/Tarzan
 Jane March as Jane Porter
 Steven Waddington as Nigel Ravens
 Winston Ntshona as Mugambe
 Rapulana Seiphemo as Kaya
 Ian Roberts as Captain Dooley
 Sean Taylor as Wilkes
 Gys De Villiers as Schiller

Production 
The film was shot in Bethlehem, Free State and Port Edward, KwaZulu-Natal South Africa.

German composer Christopher Franke composed the original musical score.

Reception 
The film received mainly negative reviews, criticizing the low budget production values, effects and writing. On review aggregator Rotten Tomatoes it has an approval rating of 6% based on reviews from 18 critics.

A rare positive review came from The New York Times, where critic Lawrence Van Gelder declared the film "A throwback to the days of Saturday afternoon adventures in exotic locales that were usually Hollywood back lots" and that it "zips along, past the ritual lions, elephants and cobras to the city of Opar and its temple of illusions, tunnels and traps, and right to the inevitable satisfying showdown."

Box Office
The film opened in the same weekend as The Big Hit and grossed $1 million in 12th place. It only took $2 million at the box office, making it a commercial failure.

References

External links 
 
 
 
 

1998 films
1990s action adventure films
1998 fantasy films
American action adventure films
American fantasy films
German action adventure films
Films set in 1913
Films set in Africa
Films shot in KwaZulu-Natal
Films shot in South Africa
Tarzan films
Village Roadshow Pictures films
Films directed by Carl Schenkel
Warner Bros. films
Films scored by Christopher Franke
English-language German films
1990s English-language films
German fantasy films
1990s American films
1990s German films